This is a list of satirical magazines which have a satirical bent,  and which may consist of fake news stories for mainly humorous purposes.

List

See also 

 List of satirists and satires
 List of satirical news websites
 List of satirical television news programs

References

Satirical